Browns Creek is a stream in the U.S. state of Tennessee.

Browns Creek has the name of a pioneer settler.

References

Rivers of Henderson County, Tennessee
Rivers of Tennessee